Aleksey Aleksandrovich Chadov (born 2 September 1981) is a Russian film actor. Brother to Andrei Chadov.

Career
Chadov made his film debut in the film War (2002) by director Aleksei Balabanov. In 2002, he received the Best Actor Award at the Montreal World Film Festival.

Soon after he starred as Kolya Malakhov in the film On the Nameless Height. In 2003, Chadov was invited by film director Andrei Proshkin to play the main role in the drama Moths Games. Also in 2003, he played a role in the blockbuster Night Watch directed by Timur Bekmambetov.

Chadov also acted in films The 9th Company, Heat, and in the Love in the City trilogy.

Selected filmography

External links
 

1981 births
Male actors from Moscow
Russian male film actors
Russian male stage actors
Russian male television actors
Living people
21st-century Russian male actors
21st-century Russian singers
21st-century Russian male singers